Rémi José Michel Mulumba (born 2 November 1992) is a professional footballer who plays as a midfielder for Turkish club Bandırmaspor. Born in France, he is a former France youth international who represents the DR Congo national team.

Career
Mulumba was born in Abbeville. He joined Amiens in 2006 and made his debut for the club on 7 May 2010 in a league match against Bayonne. On 12 July 2010, Mulumba signed a three-year professional contract with FC Lorient.

On 20 August 2019, he signed a two-year contract with Châteauroux.

On 6 July 2021, he joined Bandırmaspor in Turkey on a two-year contract.

Personal life
Mulumba is the son of former football player Albert Mulumba, a former player of SC Abbeville, whom the younger Mulumba began his career with.

References

External links
 
 
 Rémi Mulumba Club profile

1992 births
Living people
Sportspeople from Abbeville
Black French sportspeople
Footballers from Hauts-de-France
Association football midfielders
Democratic Republic of the Congo footballers
Democratic Republic of the Congo international footballers
French footballers
France youth international footballers
French sportspeople of Democratic Republic of the Congo descent
FC Lorient players
Amiens SC players
AJ Auxerre players
Dijon FCO players
Gazélec Ajaccio players
K.A.S. Eupen players
LB Châteauroux players
Bandırmaspor footballers
Ligue 1 players
Ligue 2 players
Championnat National players
TFF First League players
Belgian Pro League players
2017 Africa Cup of Nations players
Democratic Republic of the Congo expatriate footballers
French expatriate footballers
Expatriate footballers in Belgium
Expatriate footballers in Turkey
Democratic Republic of the Congo expatriate sportspeople in Belgium
Democratic Republic of the Congo expatriate sportspeople in Turkey
French expatriate sportspeople in Belgium
French expatriate sportspeople in Turkey